Barry Biggs (born 1946 St. Andrew, Jamaica) is a Jamaican reggae singer, best known in the UK for his cover of the Blue Magic song, "Sideshow", which got to number 3 in the UK Singles Chart in 1977.

Career
Biggs worked as a recording engineer and cameraman with the Jamaican Broadcasting Company, and also spent time as a member of the band the Astronauts, before becoming the lead singer for Byron Lee's Dragonaires.

It was at Lee's Dynamic Sounds studio (where he also worked as a producer and engineer) that Biggs recorded his first Jamaican hit, a cover of the Osmonds' "One Bad Apple". He broke through to international success in 1976 with "Work All Day", which had been recorded seven years earlier. Biggs had six hit singles on the UK Singles Chart between 1976 and 1981, the most successful of these, "Sideshow", reaching number 3 in January 1977. He recorded two songs with Bunny Lee; "Sincerely" and "You're Welcome" which did well in the reggae charts. He topped the reggae chart in the UK with "Wide Awake in a Dream" and "A Promise Is a Comfort to a Fool".

Many of Biggs' recordings were reggae cover versions of popular soul hits, including songs such as Stevie Wonder's "My Cherie Amour"; "Sideshow" and "Three Ring Circus" by Blue Magic; and others originally by the Chi-Lites, the Moonglows ("Sincerely"), and the Temptations ("Just My Imagination"). His version of "Love Come Down", originally recorded by Evelyn "Champagne" King, was a top 10 hit in 1983 in the Netherlands. Unlike many of his contemporaries, Biggs avoided the political and Rasta themes then popular in Jamaica.

Biggs continued to perform occasionally in the 2000s, notably at a 2008 service of thanksgiving for his former bandleader, Byron Lee.

Discography

Studio albums
Mr. Biggs – (1976) – Dynamic Sounds (also issued in 1977 as Side Show)
Sincerely – (1977) – Dynamic Sounds
Wide Awake in a Dream – (1980) – Starlight
A Promise Is A Comfort to a Fool – (1982)
Barry Biggs & The Inner Circle – (1983) – Trojan
 Coming Down With Love (1983) – Ariola
So in Love – (1989) – Starlight
Wide Awake – (1990) – Mango
Night Like This – (1994) – WEA
Love Come Down – (2000) – Wesgram Records
I've Got It Covered  – (2021) – Burning Sounds

Compilation albums
Sideshow: The Best of Barry Biggs – (1995) – Jamaican Gold
Vintage Series: Barry Biggs – (2001) – VP
Just My Imagination – (2002) – Disky Records
Sideshow: The Very Best of Barry Biggs – (2002) – Music Club
Sideshow (The best of) – (2004) – Trojan
Reggae Max – (2007) – Jet Star

Singles

References

External links
Mini biography at Kinkyjam.com
Discography at Roots Archives

Living people
People from Saint Andrew Parish, Jamaica
20th-century Jamaican male singers
Trojan Records artists
1946 births